São Miguel do Iguaçu is a municipality in the state of Paraná in the Southern Region of Brazil.

The municipality contains part of the Santa Maria Ecological Corridor, created in 2001.

See also
List of municipalities in Paraná

References

Municipalities in Paraná